Gary Allan Green (born January 14, 1962) is an American former Major League Baseball (MLB) shortstop who played for the San Diego Padres, Texas Rangers, and Cincinnati Reds between 1986 and 1992.

Amateur career
Green attended Pittsburgh's Taylor Allderdice High School and Oklahoma State University. In 1982, he played collegiate summer baseball with the Chatham A's of the Cape Cod Baseball League. He was selected three times in baseball's amateur draft: a 29th round pick by the San Francisco Giants in 1980, a second-round pick by the St. Louis Cardinals in 1983, and a first-round choice of the San Diego Padres in 1984.

Professional career
Green's best season was in 1990, when he was the starting shortstop for the Texas Rangers in 31 games. During that season, he had his most hits in a game when he went 3 for 4 against the Seattle Mariners in a 6–5 Rangers victory on August 20. In 106 major league games, he had 180 at-bats and a .222 batting average.

Coaching career
Green was the manager of the Class A West Virginia Power.

Personal
Green's father Fred Green pitched for the 1960 World Series champion Pittsburgh Pirates.

References

External links

1962 births
Living people
Major League Baseball shortstops
Baseball players from Pittsburgh
San Diego Padres players
Texas Rangers players
Cincinnati Reds players
Nashville Sounds players
Minor league baseball managers
Oklahoma State Cowboys baseball players
Chatham Anglers players
Medalists at the 1984 Summer Olympics
Olympic silver medalists for the United States in baseball
Taylor Allderdice High School alumni
Baseball players at the 1984 Summer Olympics
Alexandria Aces players
Beaumont Golden Gators players
Indianapolis Indians players
Las Vegas Stars (baseball) players
Oklahoma City 89ers players
Omaha Royals players